Kulab-e Fartaq (also Romanized as Kūlab-e Fārtaq; also known as Fartagh, Fārtaq, Fārteq, and Kūlab) is a village in Bahmayi-ye Sarhadi-ye Sharqi Rural District, Dishmok District, Kohgiluyeh County, Kohgiluyeh and Boyer-Ahmad Province, Iran. At the 2006 census, its population was 120, in 21 families.

References 

Populated places in Kohgiluyeh County